The Divorce Act may refer to:

 Divorce Act (Canada)
 Indian Divorce Act
 Divorce Act (New Zealand)

See also
Divorce law